Tele-Romeo is the third studio album by the Belgian girlgroup K3. The album was released on 3 September 2001 through label Niels William. The album is a pop album for kids. Tele-Romeo reached the peak position in both the Dutch and Flemish album charts. A limited edition of the album was released and contains an extra song ("Toveren", the fourth single from the album) and a few karaoke versions of the original songs. In 2008 a reissue was released with the original songs and an extra CD with karaoke versions of the songs.

Track listing

Personnel 
Credits for Tele-Romeo adapted from fan site.

 Kathleen Aerts – vocals
 Hans Bourlon – text (only for "Toveren")
 Karen Damen – vocals
 Peter Gillis – text, music, production, drums
 Pietro Lacirignola – saxophone
 Dieter Limbourg – saxophone
 Vincent Pierins – bass
 Serge Plume – trumpet
 Patrick Steenaerts – guitar
 Children's choir Studio 100 – vocals (background)
 Alain Vande Putte – text, music
 Johan Vanden Eede – music (only for "Toveren")
 Kristel Verbeke – vocals
 Gert Verhulst – text (only for "Toveren")
 Miguel Wiels – text, music, keyboards
 Jesper Winge Leisner – text, music (only for "Blub, ik ben een vis")

Chart performance

Weekly charts

Year-end charts

Certifications

References 

2001 albums
K3 (band) albums